Eyemouth United Football Club are a football club currently playing in the East of Scotland Football League First Division. Founded in 1948, the club, nicknamed The Fishermen play at Warner Park, Eyemouth, Berwickshire. The club's colours are maroon shirts, shorts and socks for their home strip; and Sky Blue shirts, sky blue shorts and socks for their away strip. They are currently managed by Kev Wright
.

Eyemouth were previously members of the Scottish Football Association and were allowed to enter the Scottish Cup. Their most successful run in the competition was when they reached the quarter-finals in 1959–60, eventually losing 2–1 at home to that year's finalists Kilmarnock.

Honours

East of Scotland League Champions: 1954–55, 1955–56, 1956–57, 1970–71
Scottish Qualifying Cup South Winners: 1952–53, 1958–59, 1959–60
East of Scotland (City) Cup: 1950–51, 1957–58
East of Scotland Qualifying Cup: 1953–54, 1955–56, 1956–57, 1958–59, 1971–72
King Cup: 1958–59
Scottish Border Counties FA Challenge Cup: 1954–55
South Supplementary Cup: 1954–55

References

External links

 Official Club website

Football clubs in Scotland
Association football clubs established in 1949
1949 establishments in Scotland
East of Scotland Football League teams
Eyemouth
Football clubs in the Scottish Borders